Chinna Durai or Chinnadurai may refer to:
 Chinna Durai (1999 film)
 Chinna Durai (1952 film)
M. Chinnadurai, a politician
Kumarason Chinnadurai, popularly known as Kumar
Magendiran Chinnadurai, an Indian cricketer